Dror Elimelech (Hebrew: דרור אלימלך; born 1956 in Israel) is an Israeli psychiatrist, psychotherapist, and poet, and a composer and performer of contemporary classical music.

Elimelech studied composition with Sergiu Natra and piano with Bart Berman, Ruth Hilman, and Pnina Salzman. He composes for a wide range of instrumental settings. His musical style is experimental with avant-garde influences. Elimelech established and organized several concert series in Israel for contemporary music. In 1994 he published a CD by the name of Trans.

Elimelech won the Israeli Prime Minister Prize for Hebrew writers in 2002. He has published eight books of his poetry.

References

External links
Biography in English with a picture
Biography in Hebrew with bibliography in the Lexicon of New Hebrew Literature

1956 births
20th-century classical composers
21st-century classical composers
Hebrew-language poets
Israeli classical pianists
Israeli composers
Israeli Jews
Israeli male poets
Israeli psychiatrists
Jewish poets
Israeli keyboardists
Living people
Israeli psychotherapists
Male classical composers
Jewish classical pianists
Male classical pianists
21st-century classical pianists
20th-century male musicians
21st-century male musicians